Sir James Herbert Cory, 1st Baronet (2 February 1857 – 2 February 1933) was a Welsh politician and ship-owner.

He was born at Padstow, the younger son of John Cory (founder of Cardiff-based firm John Cory, Sons & Co – not to be confused with John Cory, founder of Barry Docks).

He was Sheriff of Glamorgan in 1913 and served as Conservative MP for the Cardiff constituency from 1915 to 1918 and for Cardiff South from 1918 to 1923. He was created a baronet in 1919. In his time he was a director of 35 different companies, and gave much of his fortune to charity, particularly the King Edward VII Hospital and the Hamadryad Seamans Hospital in Cardiff.

Cory married twice, firstly to Elizabeth Hoskin Wills, with whom he had five children including Herbert George Donald Cory, who became the 2nd Baronet; Elizabeth died in 1908. He had two further daughters from his second marriage, to Elizabeth Cansh Walker, who outlived him by over twenty years.

He died at home in Coryton, Cardiff, on his 76th birthday in February 1933 and was buried at Cathays Cemetery, Cardiff. Following his death, his son's family moved into his former home at The Grange. Coryton House, which his father had built in 1900, became a local civil defence headquarters and eventually a school for autistic children.

References

External links 
 

1857 births
1933 deaths
People from Padstow
20th-century Welsh businesspeople
UK MPs 1910–1918
UK MPs 1918–1922
Baronets in the Baronetage of the United Kingdom
Knights Bachelor
Welsh businesspeople in shipping
High Sheriffs of Glamorgan
Deputy Lieutenants of Glamorgan
Members of the Parliament of the United Kingdom for Cardiff constituencies
Conservative Party (UK) MPs for Welsh constituencies
19th-century Welsh businesspeople